Agapius of Hierapolis, also called Maḥbūb ibn Qusṭanṭīn (died after 942), was a Melkite Christian historian and the bishop of Manbij. He wrote a universal history in Arabic, the lengthy Kitāb al-ʿunwān ('book of the title'). He was a contemporary of the annalist Eutychius (Said al-Bitriq), also a Melkite.

Writings
His history commences with the foundation of the world and runs up to his own times. The portion dealing with the Arab period is extant only in a single manuscript and breaks off in the second year of the caliphate of al-Mahdi (160AH = 776–7 AD) and during the time when Emperor was  Leo IV (775–780).

For the early history of Christianity, Agapius made use uncritically of apocryphal and legendary materials. For the following secular and ecclesiastical history, he relied on Syriac sources, in particular the World Chronicle of the Maronite historian Theophilus of Edessa (d. 785) for the end of the Umayyad period and the beginning of the Abbasids. He made use of Eusebius's Church History only through an intermediary compilation of short extracts. This he supplements from other sources. He gives an otherwise unknown fragment of Papias; and a list of Eastern Metropolitans. He uses the lost History of Bardaisan, but many of his sources remain unknown.

The History has been published with a French translation in the Patrologia Orientalis series and with a Latin translation in the Corpus Scriptorum Christianorum Orientalium series.

His history contains a version of the Testimonium Flavianum that lacks many of the most clearly Christian elements of the text in surviving Josephus manuscripts.


Notes

Editions

 Alexander Vassiliev (ed.), Kitab al-'Unvan (Universal History), Patrologia Orientalis, No. 5 (1910), 7 (1911), 8 (1912), 11 (1915).
 Robert G. Hoyland (ed.), Theophilus of Edessa's Chronicle and the Circulation of Historical Knowledge in Late Antiquity and Early Islam. Liverpool University Press, Liverpool 2011 (Translated Texts for Historians).
 Louis Cheikho (ed.), Agapius episcopus Mabbugensis. Historia universalis, CSCO 65, 1912.
 Robert G. Hoyland: Seeing Islam as Others Saw It. A Survey and Evaluation of Christian, Jewish and Zoroastrian Writings on Early Islam. Darwin Press, Princeton 1997, S. 440–442.
 Lucien Malouf: Agapios of Hierapolis. In: New Catholic Encyclopedia. 2. Auflage. Band 1, Detroit 2003, S. 173.

References

 Georg Graf, Geschichte der arabischen christlichen Literatur, volume 2.  Lists manuscripts of the work.
  Viktor von Rosen, Note on the manuscript of Agapios Manbidj, in Journal of the Ministry of Education, St. Petersburg, 1884.

External links 
 Kitāb al-ʿunwān, Arabic original and French translation by Alexandre Vasiliev, published in Patrologia Orientalis 1907–1915:
Part 1(1) (P.O. vol. 5 no. IV)
Part 1(2) (P.O. vol. 11 no. I)
Part 2(1) (P.O. vol. 7 no. IV)
Part 2(2) (P.O. vol. 8 no. III)
 Agapius of Hierapolis: Universal History English translation of Vasiliev's French version, at tertullian.org 

10th-century Byzantine historians
10th-century Syrian bishops
Patristic scholars
Bishops of the Greek Orthodox Church of Antioch
Melkite Greek Catholic bishops
Historians of the Catholic Church
940s deaths

Year of birth unknown
Year of death uncertain